Ditchburn is a surname. Notable people with the surname include:

Anne Ditchburn (born 1949), Canadian ballet dancer and actress
Barry Ditchburn, British Grand Prix motorcycle road racer
David Ditchburn, Scottish historian
Jim Ditchburn (1908–1964), Australian sportsman in Australian rules football and first-class cricket
John Ditchburn, Australian cartoonist
Robert Ditchburn (academic) (1903–1987), English physicist
Ross Ditchburn (born 1957), former Australian rules footballer
Ted Ditchburn (1921–2005), English professional football goalkeeper

See also
Ditchburn & Mare, British shipbuilder founded in 1837
Ditchburn Boats, manufacturer of wooden pleasure craft launches and racing boats located in Gravenhurst, Ontario on Lake Muskoka